The Europe/Africa Zone was one of the three zones of the regional Davis Cup competition in 2001.

In the Europe/Africa Zone there were four different tiers, called groups, in which teams competed against each other to advance to the upper tier. The top two teams in Group III advanced to the Europe/Africa Zone Group II in 2001, whereas the bottom two teams were relegated to the Europe/Africa Zone Group IV in 2001.

Participating nations

Draw
 Venue: Rose Hill Club, Beau Bassin-Rose Hill, Mauritius
 Date: 23–27 May

Group A

Group B

1st to 4th place play-offs

Relegation play-offs

Final standings

  and  promoted to Group II in 2002.
  relegated to Group IV in 2002.

Round robin

Group A

Bulgaria vs. Namibia

Togo vs. Macedonia

Bulgaria vs. Togo

Namibia vs. Macedonia

Bulgaria vs. Macedonia

Togo vs. Namibia

Group B

Bosnia and Herzegovina vs. Egypt

Bosnia and Herzegovina vs. Mauritius

Egypt vs. Mauritius

1st to 4th place play-offs

Semifinals

Bulgaria vs. Bosnia and Herzegovina

Egypt vs. Macedonia

Final

Bulgaria vs. Egypt

3rd to 4th play-off

Bosnia and Herzegovina vs. Macedonia

Relegation play-offs

Round robin

Mauritius vs. Namibia

Togo vs. Mauritius

References

External links
Davis Cup official website

Davis Cup Europe/Africa Zone
Europe Africa Zone Group III